The Persian Tobacco Protest (Persian: نهضت تنباکو nehzat-e tanbāku) was a Shia Muslim revolt in Iran against an 1890 tobacco concession granted by Nasir al-Din Shah of Persia to the United Kingdom, granting British control over growth, sale and export of tobacco. The protest was held by Tehran merchants in solidarity with the clerics. It climaxed in a widely obeyed December 1891 fatwa against tobacco use issued by Grand Ayatollah Mirza Hassan Shirazi.

Background
Beginning in the 19th century, the Qajar dynasty found itself in a precarious situation due to an increasing foreign presence within Iran.  Reeling from defeats in wars against Imperial Russia in 1813 and 1828, as well as the British Empire in 1857, not only was the Qajar government forced to grant countless concessions to foreign powers, but Iranian bazaaris (merchants) were left in a highly vulnerable position as they were unable to compete with the numerous economic advantages gained by merchants from Europe. According to the accounts of foreigners living in Iran at the time, the Qajar dynasty was highly unpopular among the populace and was perceived as having little concern for the welfare of its subjects.  Later accounts by British eyewitnesses suggest that the reason why the dynasty had not been overthrown sooner in the face of widespread discontent was due to British and Russian intervention that essentially propped up the shah.

In 1872, Nasir al-Din Shah negotiated a concession with Baron Julius de Reuter, a British citizen, granting him control over Persian roads, telegraphs, mills, factories, extraction of resources, and other public works in exchange for a stipulated sum for five years and 60% of all the net revenue for 20 years.  The Reuter concession was met with not only domestic outrage in the form of local protests, but also opposition from the Russian government. Under immense pressure, Nasir al-Din Shah consequently canceled the agreement despite his deteriorating financial situation.  While the concession lasted for approximately a year, the debacle set the foundation for the revolts against the tobacco concession in 1890 as it demonstrated that any attempt by a foreign power to infringe upon Iranian sovereignty would infuriate the local population as well as rival European powers.

The Tobacco Régie and subsequent protests

On 20 March 1890, Nasir al-Din Shah granted a concession to Major G. F. Talbot for a full monopoly over the production, sale, and export of tobacco for fifty years.  In exchange, Talbot paid the shah an annual sum of £15,000 (present-day £1.845 million; $2.35 million)  in addition to a quarter of the yearly profits after the payment of all expenses and a dividend of 5 percent on the capital.  By the fall of 1890 the concession had been sold to the Imperial Tobacco Corporation of Persia, a company which some have speculated was essentially Talbot himself as he heavily promoted shares in the corporation. At the time of the concession, the tobacco crop was valuable not only because of the domestic market but because Iranians cultivated a variety of tobacco "much prized in foreign markets" that was not grown elsewhere. A Tobacco Régie (monopoly) was subsequently established and all the producers and owners of tobacco in Persia were forced to sell their goods to agents of the Régie, who would then resell the purchased tobacco at a price that was mutually agreed upon by the company and the sellers with disputes settled by compulsory arbitration.

At the time, the Persian tobacco industry employed over 200,000 people and therefore the concession represented a major blow to Persian farmers and bazaaris whose livelihoods were largely dependent on the lucrative tobacco business.  Now they were forced to seek permits from the Tobacco Régie as well as required to inform the concessionaires of the amount of tobacco produced.  In essence the concession not only violated the long-established relationship between Persian tobacco producers and tobacco sellers, but it also threatened the job security of a significant portion of the population.

In September 1890, the first resounding protest against the concession manifested, however it did not emerge from the Persian merchant class or ulema but rather from the Russian government who stated that the Tobacco Régie violated freedom of trade in the region as stipulated by the Treaty of Turkmanchai. Despite disapproval from the Russian Empire concerning the monopoly, Nasir al-Din Shah was intent on continuing on with the concession.  In February 1891 Major G. F. Talbot traveled to Iran to install the Tobacco Régie and soon thereafter the shah made news of the concession public for the first time, sparking immediate disapproval throughout the country.  Despite the rising tensions, director of the Tobacco Régie Julius Ornstein arrived in Tehran in April and was assured by Prime Minister Amin al-Sultan that the concession had the full support of the Qajar dynasty. In the meantime, anonymous letters were being sent to high members of the Qajar government while placards were circulating in cities such as Tehran and Tabriz, both displaying public anger towards the granting of concessions to foreigners.

During the spring of 1891, mass protests against the Régie began to emerge in major Iranian cities.  Initially it was the bazaaris who led the opposition under the conviction that it was their income and livelihood which were at stake.  Affluent merchants such as Hajj Mohammad Malek al-Tojjar played a vital role in the tobacco movement by organizing bazaari protests as well as appealing to well known mujtahids for their support in opposing the Régie.  The ulema proved to be a highly valuable ally of the bazaari as key religious leaders sought to protect national interests from foreign domination.  For centuries the ulema played a paramount role in Iranian society – they ran religious schools, maintained the charity of endowments, acted as arbiters and judges, and were seen as the intermediaries between God and Shia Muslims in the country.  Hence if such exorbitant concessions were given to non-Muslim foreigners, the ulema believed that the national-religious community under their supervision would be severely threatened.  Furthermore, the ulema had ties with various merchant families and guilds while holding an economic interest in tobacco that was grown on waqf land. Finally, as the clergy pointed out, the concession directly contradicted Islamic law because individuals were not allowed to purchase or sell tobacco under their own free will and were unable to go elsewhere for business. Later during the tobacco harvest season of 1891, tobacco cultivator Mahmud Zaim of the Kashan region coordinated with Iran's two other major tobacco cultivators a burning of their entire stock.

The cities of Shiraz, Tehran, and Tabriz would subsequently develop into the most prominent centers of opposition to the tobacco concession.  In May 1891, Sayyed Ali Akbar, a prominent molla (mullah) of Shiraz was removed from the city by orders of Nasir al-Din Shah due to his preaching against the concession.  During his departure from Iran, Sayyed Ali Akbar met with prominent pan-Islamist activist Jamal al-Din al-Afghani, and at Akbar's request Afghani wrote a letter to the leading Shia cleric Mirza Hasan Shirazi asking the mujtahid to "save and defend [the] country" from "this criminal who has offered the provinces of the land of Iran to auction amongst the Great Powers." Though Shirazi would later send a personal telegram to the shah warning the leader about the pitfalls of giving concessions to foreigners, this personal appeal did nothing to put an end to the Régie.

Government intervention may have helped in mitigating the hostilities in Shiraz following Akbar's removal, however other regions of Iran still saw a proliferation in protests.  Bazaaris in Tehran were among the first groups of people to protest against the concession by writing letters of disapproval to the shah even before the concession was publicly announced.  It has been argued that this initial opposition stemmed from a Russian attempt to stir up frustration within the merchant community of Tehran. Although Azarbaijan, the north western region of Iran, was not a tobacco-growing area, it saw tremendous opposition to the concession due to the large concentration of local merchants and retail traders in the region. In Isfahan a boycott of the consumption of tobacco was implemented even prior to Shirazi's fatwa (discussed below) while in the city of Tabriz, the bazaar closed down and the ulema stopped teaching in the madrasas.  The cities of Mashhad and Kerman also experienced demonstrations in opposition to the concession yet historian Mansoor Moaddel argues that these latter movements were relatively ineffective. Other cities around the country such as Qazvin, Yazd, and Kermanshah were also involved in opposing the shah and the Tobacco Régie.

Shirazi's fatwa and the repudiation of the concession
In December 1891, a fatwa was issued by the most important religious authority in Iran, marja'-i taqlid Mirza Hasan Shirazi, declaring the use of tobacco to be tantamount to war against the Hidden Imam, Muhammad al-Mahdi.  The reference to the Hidden Imam, a critical person in Shia Islam, meant that Shirazi was using the strongest possible language to oppose the Régie.  Initially there was skepticism over the legitimacy of the fatwa; however, Shirazi would later confirm the declaration.

Iranians in the capital of Tehran refused to smoke tobacco and this collective response spread to neighboring provinces. In a show of solidarity, Iranian merchants responded by shutting down the main bazaars throughout the country.  As the tobacco boycott grew larger, Nasir al-Din Shah and Prime Minister Amin al-Sultan found themselves powerless to stop the popular movement fearing Russian intervention in case a civil war materialized.

Prior to the fatwa, tobacco consumption had been so prevalent in Iran that it was smoked everywhere, including inside mosques.  European observers noted that "most Iranians would rather forego bread than tobacco, and the first thing they would do at the breaking of the fast during the month of Ramadan was to light their pipes."  Despite the popularity of tobacco, the religious ban was so successful that it was said that women in the shah's harem quit smoking and his servants refused to prepare his water pipe.

By January 1892, when the shah saw that the British government "was waffling in its support for the Imperial Tobacco Company," he canceled the concession. The fatwa has been called a "stunning" demonstration of the power of the marja'-i taqlid, and the protest itself has been cited as one of the issues that led to the Persian Constitutional Revolution a few years later.

Aftermath
Following the cancellation of the concession, there were still difficulties between the Qajar government and the Imperial Tobacco Corporation of Persia in terms of negotiating the amount of compensation that would be paid to the company.  Eventually, it was decided that the sum was to be £500,000 (£61,000,000 inflation-corrected to 2018 value, corresponds to $77,600,000).  While many Iranians were happy about preventing foreign commercial influence in the country, the tobacco movement had far greater implications than they would even realize.  Historian Nikki Keddie notes that the movement was significant because "Iranians saw for the first time that it was possible to win out against the Shah and foreign interests… there is a direct line from the coalition which participated in the tobacco movement… culminating in the Constitutional Revolution" and arguably the Iranian Revolution as well.

For Nasir Al-Din Shah, the protest left him both financially handicapped and publicly humiliated.  Iran was forced to contract a loan from Russia and became a debtor state.  At the end of his rule, Nasir Al-Din became much more hostile towards the West, preventing any form of European education or travel.

See also
 Iran–United Kingdom relations
 Islamic views on tobacco
 Persian Constitutional Revolution
 Muhammad Kazim Khurasani 
 Zainab Pasha

References

Further reading
 
 
 
 

1890 in economics
1890 in Iran
1891 in economics
1891 in Iran
1892 in Iran
Civil disobedience
Boycotts
Economic history of Iran
Iran–United Kingdom relations
Politics of Qajar Iran
Protests in Iran
Tobacco in Iran